The Stillwater Commercial Historic District encompasses 11 downtown blocks in Stillwater, Minnesota, United States.  It comprises 63 contributing properties built from the 1860s to 1940.  It was listed as a historic district on the National Register of Historic Places in 1992 for its local significance in the themes of architecture and commerce.  It was nominated for reflecting the economic and architectural diversity of a prosperous lumbering and manufacturing center.

See also
 National Register of Historic Places listings in Washington County, Minnesota

References

Buildings and structures in Washington County, Minnesota
Commercial buildings on the National Register of Historic Places in Minnesota
Historic districts on the National Register of Historic Places in Minnesota
National Register of Historic Places in Washington County, Minnesota
Stillwater, Minnesota